Charles Howard, 2nd Earl of Berkshire KB (1615 – April 1679) was an English peer, styled Viscount Andover from 1626 to 1669, was the eldest son of Thomas Howard, 1st Earl of Berkshire and his wife Lady Elizabeth Cecil.

Early career

Howard was created a Knight of the Bath in 1626. He was elected the MP for Oxford in 1640, but was never seated as he was given a writ of acceleration to the House of Lords before the beginning of the session. He was a Royalist sergeant-major of horse in 1643, and a Gentleman of the Bedchamber to Charles II in exile, from 1658 to 1660. He succeeded his father as Earl of Berkshire in 1669.

Popish Plot

As an influential member of the Catholic nobility, and a staunch supporter of the Duke of York, the Catholic heir to the throne, he was, like his cousin William Howard, 1st Viscount Stafford (who was executed for treason in 1680), an obvious target of Titus Oates  and other informers during the Popish Plot. More wary of the danger than was Stafford, he fled abroad in November 1678 before any accusation of treason was made against him, and died in Paris the following April. 

No credible evidence of treason was ever produced against him, although it has been argued that his sudden flight was suspicious in itself. A number of supposedly incriminating letters which he wrote in 1674 merely confirmed his political support for the future James II, who he promised to stand by "in the dark hour of his fortune", and his alleged deathbed confession to a treasonable conspiracy is now regarded as a forgery.

Family 

On 10 April 1637, he married Hon. Dorothy Savage, daughter of Thomas Savage, 1st Viscount Savage and Elizabeth Savage, Countess Rivers. They had three sons who all died young, and one daughter, Anne (c. 1650 – 19 September 1682) who married in 1666 to Henry Bedingfield, but died childless. With no male issue, he was succeeded by his brother Thomas in 1679. Either Charles or Thomas is believed to have illegitimately fathered royal mistress Moll Davis.

References

|-

1615 births
1679 deaths
Charles
Knights of the Bath
Charles Howard, 2nd Earl of Berkshire
Charles
Cavaliers
Andover, Charles Howard, Viscount